The Governor John Rutledge House is a historic house at 116 Broad Street in Charleston, South Carolina. Completed in 1763 by an unknown architect, it was the home of Founding Father John Rutledge, a Governor of South Carolina and a signer of the United States Constitution.  It was declared a National Historic Landmark in 1973.

Description and history
The John Rutledge House is located in historic Charleston, on the north side of Broad Street, opposite its junction with Orange Street, and the Edward Rutledge House, the home of John's brother.  It is a tall three-story structure, rendered even taller by its placement on a raised basement.  It has a hip roof with a front-facing gable, stuccoed walls, and corner quoining.  The front facade is distinguished by an ornate two-story wrought iron balcony, which is believed to have been made by Christopher Werner.

The house was built as a two-story structure for John Rutledge in 1763, by which time he had already established a successful law practice.  Rutledge played a significant role in organizing the Patriot forces of South Carolina during the American Revolutionary War, serving as the state's executive for much of the conflict.  He also attended the Constitutional Convention of 1787, and is a signer of the United States Constitution.  The house passed out of his family, and was enlarged by the addition of the third story in 1853 by Thomas M. Gadsden.  The house served as a law office in the 20th century.

John Rutledge House Inn 
In 1989, the house was renovated and opened to the public as the John Rutledge House Inn.

The inn has 19 guest rooms, ranging from standard hotel rooms to large suites. 11 of these rooms are located in the main house, with the remaining 8 being in the carriage houses (located at the rear of the property). In addition to the guest rooms, the house contains a ball room (open to the public), which is used for afternoon tea as well as breakfast.

The John Rutledge House has received a 4 diamond rating from AAA, and is a member of both the Select Registry and Historic Hotels of America.

See also

List of National Historic Landmarks in South Carolina
National Register of Historic Places listings in Charleston, South Carolina

References

External links
Governor John Rutledge House, Charleston County (116 Broad St., Charleston), at South Carolina Department of Archives and History
Historic Federal Courthouses from the Federal Judicial Center
Website for the John Rutledge House Bed & Breakfast

National Historic Landmarks in South Carolina
Houses in Charleston, South Carolina
Houses on the National Register of Historic Places in South Carolina
Former federal courthouses in the United States
Houses completed in 1763
National Register of Historic Places in Charleston, South Carolina
Bed and breakfasts in South Carolina
Historic district contributing properties in South Carolina
Governor of South Carolina
Historic Hotels of America
Homes of United States Founding Fathers